Caijsa Wilda Hennemann (born 22 March 2001) is a Swedish professional tennis player.

On 1 November 2022, she achieved her best singles ranking of world No. 285. On 10 October 2022, she peaked at No. 154 in the WTA doubles rankings.

Hennemann made her WTA Tour main-draw debut at the 2019 Swedish Open, after receiving a wildcard into the singles draw, and the doubles draw, partnering Lisa Zaar.

She started playing tennis at the age of seven. Personal Interests: Football (Gais), tennis and other sports, favourite tennis player: Maria Sharapova.

Hennemann had a successful junior career. She managed to reach the final of the European Tennis Championship both as a 16- and 18-year-old. Played all junior Grand Slams and in 2019 went to the quarterfinals of the French Open, where she lost to Qinwen Zheng 1-6 6-3 3-6. As a junior, Hennemann was ranked best as world No. 30.

ITF Circuit finals

Singles: 5 (4 titles, 1 runner–up)

Doubles: 16 (13 titles, 3 runner-ups)

References

External links
 
 

2001 births
Living people
Sportspeople from Gothenburg
Swedish female tennis players
21st-century Swedish women